Joseph Dunbar Robertson (born March 10, 1948) is a Canadian former professional ice hockey player.

Early life 
Robertson was born in Windsor, Nova Scotia, and attended King's-Edgehill School. He played junior hockey with the Oshawa Generals.

Career 
Robertson began his minor league career with the Clinton Comets of the Eastern Hockey League. He was later a member of the Omaha Knights, Salt Lake Golden Eagles, Seattle Totems, and Cincinnati Swords. During the 1974–75 season, Robertson played 29 games in the World Hockey Association with the Minnesota Fighting Saints and Indianapolis Racers.

References

External links

1948 births
Living people
Canadian ice hockey centres
Cincinnati Swords players
Clinton Comets players
Indianapolis Racers players
Johnstown Jets players
Minnesota Fighting Saints players
Omaha Knights (CHL) players
Oshawa Generals players
Salt Lake Golden Eagles (WHL) players
Seattle Totems (WHL) players
Syracuse Eagles players
People from Windsor, Nova Scotia
Ice hockey people from Nova Scotia
Canadian expatriate ice hockey players in the United States